This article lists notable television series produced and/or owned by past and present divisions and subsidiaries of Paramount Global.

The present divisions and subsidiaries includes Paramount Television Studios, CBS Studios, CBS Media Ventures, CBS News, Paramount Media Networks, Awesomeness and Showtime Networks. The past and present divisions and subsidiaries includes CBS Productions, Viacom Productions/Enterprises, Big Ticket Television, DreamWorks Television, Miramax Television, Desilu Productions, the older incarnation of Paramount Television, Bing Crosby Productions, Rysher Entertainment, Television Program Enterprises, Republic Pictures Television, Laurel Entertainment, ABC Films, NBC Films, QM Productions, Taft Entertainment Television/Worldvision Enterprises, Group W/Eyemark Entertainment, King World Productions and Spelling Television.

CBS Studios 
Note: Formerly known as CBS Paramount Television and CBS Television Studios.

Paramount Television

Desilu Productions

Viacom Productions 
 The Terrytoons library (1921–1986) (passed over from CBS, ownership eventually coming full-circle back to CBS in 2006)

CBS Productions 
Most pre-1976 series produced by CBS or distributed by CBS Films were later distributed by Viacom and Paramount Television, then eventually came back full-circle to CBS in 2006.Note: Alternatively known as CBS Entertainment Productions from 1978 to 1995.

CBS Eye Productions

CBS Eye Animation Productions

Late Night Cartoons, Inc.

Big Ticket Entertainment 
Note: Also known as Big Ticket Television.

Paramount Television Studios

Upcoming

In development

DreamWorks Television

Miramax Television

Paramount Digital Entertainment

Insurge Pictures

CBS News 

 CBS Evening News (1941–present)
 Person to Person (1953–present)
 Face the Nation (1954–present)
 CBS Morning News (1963–present)
 60 Minutes (1968–present)
 In the News (1971–1986; 1997–1998) (interstitial series)
 Who's Who (1977)
 Razzmatazz (1977–1982) (co-production with Scholastic Magazines, Inc.)
 30 Minutes (1978–1982)
 CBS News Sunday Morning (1979–present)
 CBS Overnight News (1982–present)
 West 57th (August 13, 1985 – September 9, 1989)
 The Morning Program (1987)
 CBS This Morning (1987–1999; 2012–2021)
 48 Hours (January 19, 1988 – present)
 Saturday Night with Connie Chung (1990)
 America Tonight (October 1, 1990 – 1991)
 Street Stories (January 9, 1992 – June 10, 1993)
 Eye to Eye with Connie Chung (June 17, 1993 – May 25, 1995)
 20th Century with Mike Wallace (1994–2005)
 CBS Saturday Morning (1997–present)
 Public Eye with Bryant Gumbel (October 1, 1997 – 1998)
 60 Minutes II (January 13, 1999 – September 2, 2005)
 The Early Show (1999–2012)
 365gay News (2005–2009) (co-production with Logo)
 60 Minutes Sports (2013–2017) (co-production with Showtime Networks)
 Brooklyn DA (2013)
 CBS Weekend News (2016–present)
 Whistleblower (2018–2019) (co-production with CBS Studios)
 Boiling Point (2021–present) (co-production with BET Studios)
 60 Minutes+ (2021–present)
 CBS News Flash (2021–present)
 CBS Mornings (2021–present)

See It Now Studios

CBS Sports

Paramount Media Networks

MTV Entertainment Studios

Nickelodeon Productions

Nickelodeon Animation Studio

Awesomeness

Comedy Partners

Paramount Network (Spike Cable Networks Inc.)

Country Music Television

Premium Network Group

Showtime Networks

Showtime Documentary Films

BET Networks

Pop Media Group

VIS

Paramount International Networks

Channel 5 Broadcasting

Ten Network Holdings

Telefe Contenidos

CBS Media Ventures 
Note: Formerly known as CBS Television Distribution.

Ad sales

King World Productions

Group W/Eyemark Entertainment

Spelling Television 
Note: Formerly known as Aaron Spelling Productions and Spelling Entertainment Inc.

Laurel Entertainment

Worldvision Enterprises

ABC Films (pre-1973)

Taft Entertainment Television

QM Productions 
Note: Formerly known as Quinn Martin Productions

Republic Pictures Television

National Telefilm Associates 
 China Smith (1952–1955) (Currently owned by Richard Duryea and Bernard Tabakin)
 Sheriff of Cochise/U.S. Marshall (1956–1958)
 How to Marry a Millionaire (1957–1959)
 Man Without a Gun (1957–1959)
 Official Detective (1957–1958)
 The Walter Winchell File (1957–1958)
 George Jessel's Show Business (1958)
 The Adventures of William Tell (1958–1959) (produced by ITC Entertainment)
 African Patrol (1958–1959)
 This is Alice (1958–1959)
 Mantovani (1959)
 Grand Jury (1959)
 The Third Man (1959–1965) (co-production with British Broadcasting Prestige Productions)
 Assignment: Underwater (1960–1962)
 Q. T. Hush (1960–1961)
 The Crime Reporter

NBC Films (pre-1973)

California National Productions

Rysher Entertainment 
CBS Media Ventures owns the distribution rights to the Rysher Entertainment television library, which is currently owned by Vine Alternative Investments.

Bing Crosby Productions

Television Program Enterprises

Television movies and specials

Paramount Television

Wilshire Court Productions

Viacom Pictures/Productions 
 Evel Knievel (1974)
 A Question of Love (1978)
 A Last Cry for Help (1979)
 She's Dressed to Kill (1979)
 Heaven Only Knows (1979)
 To Race the Wind (1980)
 Nurse (1980)
 All God's Children (1980)
 Angel on My Shoulder (1980)
 Enola Gay: The Men, The Mission, The Atomic Bomb (1980)
 East of Eden (1981)
 For Ladies Only (1981)
 Thursday's Child (1983)
 The Return of the Man from U.N.C.L.E.: The Fifteen Years Later Affair (1983) (with Michael Sloan Productions)
 The Face of Rage (1983)
 Concrete Beat (1984)
 The Ratings Game (1984)
 Kids Don't Tell (1985)
 Suburban Beat (1985)
 Perry Mason Returns (1985)
 Return to Mayberry (1986)
 The Secret Garden (1987)
 Payoff (1991)
 The Fear Inside (1992)
 Paris Trout (1992)
 Nails (1992)
 Scam (1993)
 Children of the Mist (1993)
 Gramps (1995)
 Sabrina the Teenage Witch (1996)
 The Right Connections (1997)
 Sabrina Goes to Rome (1998)
 In the Doghouse (1998)
 Sabrina Down Under (1999)
 Avalon: Beyond the Abyss (1999)
 Two of Us (2000)
 Love Song (2000)
 Once Upon a Christmas (2000)
 Warden of Red Rock (2001)
 The Wilde Girls (2001)
 Twice Upon a Christmas (2001)
 Bang Bang You're Dead (2002)
 Finding John Christmas (2003)
 The Legend of Butch & Sundance (2003)

Paramount Television Studios

DreamWorks Television 
 Dear Diary (1996) (pilot)
 Giving Harry the Business (1996) (unaired pilot)
 Fully-Clothed, Non-Dancing Girls (1996) (unaired pilot)
 Twin Cities (1996) (unaired pilot)
 For the People (1996) (unaired pilot)
 7:08 (1997) (unaired pilot)
 Anna Says (1998) (unaired pilot)
 The Duplex (1999) (unaired pilot)
 Sugar Hill (1999) (unaired pilot)
 We Stand Alone Together: The Men of Easy Company (2001) (co-production with Playtone and Cowen/Richter Productions for HBO)

Miramax Television 
 Robinson Crusoe (1997) (co-production with RHI Entertainment)
 A Wrinkle in Time (2003) (as Dimension Television; co-production with BLT Productions and Fireworks Entertainment)
 The I Inside (2004) (as Dimension Television)

CBS Studios 
 Out of Office (2022) (co-production with MTV Entertainment Studios and Propagate Content)
 Pickled (2022) (co-production with Spartina Productions and Funny or Die)
 Reindeer in Here (2022) (co-production with CBS Eye Animation Productions, The Tiny Toons Co. and Jam Filled Entertainment)

CBS Productions 
Note: Alternatively known as CBS Entertainment Productions from 1978 to 1995.
 Rose Parade (1948–2005)
 The Thanksgiving Day Parade on CBS (1948–present)
 Summer is Forever (1969)
 The Brotherhood of the Bell (September 17, 1970)
 11:59: Last Minute to Choose (1971)
 The Cat in the Hat (March 10, 1971)
 The American Revolution: 1770-1783: A Conversation with Lord North (1971)
 Goodbye, Raggedy Ann (October 22, 1971)
 A Death of Innocence (November 26, 1971)
 Mongo's Back in Town (December 10, 1971)
 Something Evil (January 21, 1972)
 The Lorax (February 14, 1972)
 The Family Rico (September 12, 1972)
 Deadly Harvest (September 26, 1972)
 The House Without a Christmas Tree (December 3, 1972)
 Hunter (1973)
 The Horror at 37,000 Feet (February 13, 1973)
 Coffee, Tea or Me? (September 11, 1973)
 Dr. Seuss on the Loose (October 15, 1973)
 The Thanksgiving Treasure (November 18, 1973)
 The Migrants (February 3, 1974)
 Addie and the King of Hearts (January 17, 1975)
 The Hoober-Bloob Highway (February 19, 1975)
 The Easter Promise (March 19, 1975)
 Thaddeus Rose and Eddie (February 22, 1978)
 30th Primetime Emmy Awards (September 17, 1978) (co-production for Academy of Television Arts & Sciences)
 Like Mom, Like Me (October 22, 1978)
 You Can't Go Home Again (1979)
 The Wild Wild West Revisited (May 9, 1979)
 More Wild Wild West (October 7–8, 1980)
 33rd Primetime Emmy Awards (September 13, 1981) (co-production for Academy of Television Arts & Sciences)
 A Tribute to Count Basie (1981)
 Killing at Hell's Gate (1981)
 The Million Dollar Infield (1982)
 Muggable Mary, Street Cop (1982)
 Rascals and Robbers: The Secret Adventures of Tom Sawyer and Huckleberry Finn (February 27, 1982)
 Napoleon Conquers America (1982)
 The Gift of Life (1982)
 Maid in America (1982)
 Drop-Out Father (September 27, 1982)
 Country Gold (November 23, 1982)
 Games Mother Never Taught You (November 27, 1982)
 Listen to Your Heart (1982)
 Illusions (January 18, 1983)
 Another Woman's Child (January 19, 1983)
 Running Out (January 26, 1983)
 The Other Woman (March 22, 1983)
 First Affair (October 25, 1983)
 Two Kinds of Love (November 8, 1983)
 Quarterback Princess (December 3, 1983)
 Hobson's Choice (December 21, 1983)
 Last of The Great Survivors (1983)
 Calamity Jane (March 6, 1984)
 Getting Physical (March 20, 1984)
 First Steps (March 19, 1985)
 Brotherly Love (May 28, 1985)
 Classified Love (March 8, 1986)
 Blind Justice (March 9, 1986)
 That Secret Sunday (1986)
 One Police Plaza (1986)
 Deadly Deception (1987)
 Gunsmoke: Return to Dodge (1987)
 Body of Evidence (January 24, 1988)
 Case Closed (April 19, 1988) (co-production with Houston Motion Picture Entertainment, Inc.)
 Fifty Years of Television: A Golden Celebration (November 26, 1989)
 Gunsmoke: The Last Apache (1990)
 Shangri-la Plaza (1990) (pilot; co-production with Castle/Safan/Mueller Productions)
 Goodnight, Sweet Wife: A Murder in Boston (1990) (co-production with Arnold Shapiro Productions)
 The Honeymooners Anniversary Special (1990)
 Donor (1990)
 Blood River (1991) (co-production with Little Apple Productions)
 Gunsmoke: To the Last Man (1992)
 The Year of the General (1992)
 Guiding Light: The Primetime Special (1992)
 Secret Lives of Husbands and Wives (1992)
 Moment of Truth (1992)
 Ultimate Revenge (1992 TV pilot) (co-production with Woody Fraser Productions and Reeves Entertainment)
 The President's Child (1992)
 Malcolm X: The Real Story (1992)
 Somalia: A Country is Dying (1992)
 Coming Up Roses (1993–2002)
 The Carol Burnett Show: A Reunion (1993)
 The Man with Three Wives (1993) (co-production with Arnold Shapiro Productions)
 Gunsmoke: The Long Ride (1993)
 Labor of Love: The Arlette Schweitzer Story (1993)
 With Hostile Intent (1993)
 Love, Honor & Obey: The Last Mafia Marriage (1993) (co-production with Reteitalia Productions, SPA)
 The Legend of The Beverly Hillbillies (1993)
 Schwarzkopf in Vietnam: A Soldier Returns (1993)
 Harlan and Merleen (1993; two-part TV pilot)
 For Love and Glory (1993)
 Jack (1993)
 Terror in the Night (1994)
 Gunsmoke: One Man's Justice (1994)
 Search for Grace (1994)
 D-Day (1994)
 Angels Among Us (1994 TV pilot)
 Halloween! (1994)
 In the Shadow of Evil (February 7, 1995)
 Magician's Favorite Magicians (1995) (co-production with Armand Grant DGS., Inc. and Milt Larsen Brookledge Corporation)
 The Man in the Attic (1995) (co-production with Showtime Networks)
 A Streetcar Named Desire (October 29, 1995)
 A Mother's Instinct (March 13, 1996)
 Uncommon Heroes (1996 TV pilot) (co-production with Arnold Shapiro Productions)
 The Story of Santa Claus (1996)
 Stolen Woman, Captured Hearts (1997)
 Heart Full of Rain (1997)
 Monday After the Miracle (1998)
 Murder at 75 Birch (1999)
 26th Daytime Emmy Awards (1999)
 A Song From the Heart (1999)
 Secret of Giving (1999)
 One Kill (2000)
 The Christmas Secret (2000)
 Blackout (2001)
 Dr Quinn: The Heart Within (2001)
 The Sons of Mistletoe (2001)

CBS News 
 National Drivers Test (1965)
 16 in Webster Groves (1966)
 Inside Pop: The Rock Revolution (1967)
 Children of Apartheid (1987)
 Cronkite Remembers (May 23, 1996)
 Demolition Day: Seattle Kingdome (2000)
 Criminal: Punks vs. Preps (2000)
 Summer of Terror: The Real Son of Sam Story (2001)
 Inside Flight 93 (2002)
 Survivor: The Reunion (2002) (co-production with Castaway Television Productions)
 Be Your Own Hero: Call to Duty (2002)
 Burning Questions (2002)
 The Horrors of Hussein (2003)
 Deadly Deception: The Mark Hacking Story (2004)
 Impossible City (2004)
 Lifeline: The Nursing Diaries (2004)
 Global Issues for Students: Africa: Challenges in the 21st Century (2004) (co-production with Schlessinger Media)
 Betrayal: The Battle for Warsaw (2005)
 CBS News on Logo: Special Report on AIDS (co-production with Logo TV)
 Hot Zips (2006)
 Dust of Dust: The Health Effects of 9/11 (2006) (co-production with Tinderbox Media Group)
 2007: The Year In Animals (2007)
 First Arab Isareli Plane Hijacking (2007) (co-production with CBS Eye Productions)
 Killer Virus: Hunt for the Next Plague (2008)
 Collapse: When Structures Fail (2008)
 Dark Fellowships: The Vril (2008) (co-production with Silent Crow Arts)
 When Nature Strikes (2008)
 Crash: The Next Great Depression? (2008)
 New Life on Mars? (2009)
 Amatomy of a Pandemic (2009)
 The Truth About Pandemic (2009) (co-production with Silent Crow Arts)
 Understanding Ardi (2009) (co-production with Silent Crow Arts)
 The Gayle King Interview with R. Kelly (2019)
 Creating Syntheitc Life: Your Questions Answered (2010)

See It Now Studios 
 26th Street Garage: The FBI's Untold Story of 9/11 (2021) (co-production with Efran Films)
 Race Against Time: The CIA and 9/11 (2021)
 Undeniable: The Truth to Remember (2022) (co-production with ATTN:)

CBS Eye Productions 
 Traitors Within (2002)
 History Now: SARS and the New Plagues (2003)
 The 9/11 Commission Report (2004)
 First Arab Israeli Plane Hijacking (2007) (co-production with CBS News)
 Shark Week: Day of the Shark (2008) (co-production with Beanfield Productions)
 Disaster on K2 (2009) (co-production with Beanfield Productions, Ascending Path and Capsule Media)
 Ripped Off: Maddoff and the Scamming of America (2009)
 Kidnapped for 18 Years: The Jaycee Dugard Story (2009)
 TV Murders: Jasmine Fiore and Anne Pressly (2010)
 Who Is the Real Jordan van der Sloot? (2010)
 Best of the Road (2012)
 David Letterman: A Life on Television (2015)

Paramount Media Networks

MTV Entertainment Studios

Nickelodeon Productions

 Wild Rides (1982)
 UFO Kidnapped (1983) (co-production with Carleton Productions)
 School Stories From Famous People (1986)
 Nickelodeon Kids' Choice Awards (1988–present)
 Nick's Thanksgiving Fest (November 22, 1989)
 Nickelodeon Studios Opening Day Celebration (1990)
 Tales From The Whoop: Hot Rod Brown, Class Clown (October 20, 1990)
 Stories from Growing Up (February 23, 1991) (co-production with Think Entertainment)
 Letters to the Earth (1993)
 The Big Help-a-thon (1994–1998)
 Those Nick at Nite Promos: 10 Years of Better Living Through Television (1995)
 Road to the Extreme Arena: Behind the Scenes of Global GUTS (1995)
 "Oh Brother" Starring Stick Stickly (1995)
 Nickelodeon Sports Theater with Shaquille O'Neal (1996–1999)
 "Stuck" Starring Stick Stickly (1997)
 Good Burger: On the Job with Kenan & Kel (1997)
 Nickellennium (2000)
 Cry Baby Lane (2000)
 Blue's Big Musical Movie (2000)
 Rugrats Tales from the Crib: Snow White (2005)
 Rugrats Tales from the Crib: Three Jacks & The Beanstalk (2006)
 SpongeBob's Atlantis SquarePantis (2007)
 Nickelodeon HALO Awards (2009–2017)
 Nickelodeon Kids' Choice Sports (2014–present)
 SpongeBob's Big Birthday Blowout (2019)
 Rocko's Modern Life: Static Cling (2019)
 Invader Zim: Enter the Florpus (2019)

Nickelodeon Animation Studio

Awesomeness

Comedy Partners
 This is MST3K (1992)
 The Hebrew Hammer (2003) (co-production with ContentFilm and Intrinsic Value Films)
 Windy City Heat (2003) (co-production with Jackhole Productions and Dakota Pictures)
 A Colbert Christmas: The Greatest Gift of All! (2008) (co-production with Spartina Productions)
 Bo Burnham: Words, Words, Words (2010) (co-production with 3 Arts Entertainment and Art & Industry)
 Daniel Tosh: Happy Thoughts (2011) (co-production with Irwin Entertainment and Black Hearts Productions)
 Norm Macdonald: Me Doing Standup (2011) (co-production with Irwin Entertainment, Norm Macdonald Productions and Brillstein Entertainment Partners)
 6 Days to Air (2011)
 Jo Koy: Lights Out (2012) (co-production with Art & Industry)
 Eugene! (2012) (co-production with Jax Media)
 Jeff Ross Roasts America (2012) (co-production with Enough with the Bread Already Productions and Tagline Television)
 Demetri Martin: Standup Comedian (2012) (co-production with PersonGlobal and Irwin Entertainment)
 D.L. Hughley: The Endangered List (2012) (co-production with Five Timez Productions, Kahn Miller Greenberg and 3 Arts Entertainment)
 Al Madrigal: Why Is The Rabbit Crying? (2013) (co-production with Pupcake Productions and Brillstein Entertainment Partners)
 Steve Rannazzisi: Manchild (2013) (co-production with Brillstein Entertainment Partners and Irwin Entertainment)
 Neal Brennan: Woman and Black Dudes (2014) (co-production with Neal Brennan, Inc., Irwin Entertainment and Brillstein Entertainment Partners)
 Ari Shaffir: Paid Regular (2015) (co-production with Tax Industries and Art & Industry)
 Nick Swardson: Taste It (2015) (co-production with Irwin Entertainment and Brillstein Entertainment Partners)
 Bridget Everett: Gynaecological Wonder (2015) (co-production with Red Hour Productions and Beavertail Productions)
 Steve Rannazzisi: Breaking Dad (2015) (co-production with Thank You, Brain! Productions and Brillstein Entertainment Partners)
 Nikki Glaser: Perfect (2016) (co-production with Irwin Entertainment, Perfect, Convy Entertainment and Brillstein Entertainment Partners)
 Big Jay Oakerson: Live at Wembley Hall (2016) (co-production with Angry Buddha Films, ScooBADoo Productions and Jax Media)
 Roy Wood Jr.: Father Figure (2017) (co-production with Art & Industry)
 Roy Wood Jr.: Imperfect Messenger (2021) (co-production with MTV Entertainment Studios, Bob Bain Productions and Mainstay Entertainment)
 A Clüsterfünke Christmas (2021) (co-production with MTV Entertainment Studios, Lighthouse Pictures and Wishing Floor Films)
 Hot Mess Holiday (2021) (co-production with MTV Entertainment Studios and Gunpowder and Sky)
 South Park: Post Covid (2021) (co-production with MTV Entertainment Studios and South Park Studios)
 Reno 911!: The Hunt for QAnon (2021) (co-production with MTV Entertainment Studios and High Sierra Carpeting)
 South Park: The 25th Anniversary Concert (2022) (co-production with MTV Entertainment Studios and Alex Coletti Productions)

Paramount Network (Spike Cable Networks Inc.)
 Bam's World Domination (2010) (co-production with Time Inc. Studios and Capital V Productions)
 Alternate History: Nazi's Win WW2 (2011) (co-production with Flight 33 Productions)

Premium Network Group

Showtime Networks 

Halcyon Studios distributes most Showtime Original Pictures made between 1995 and 2000 outside of the U.S. and Canada.
 Gotham (1988) (co-production with Phoenix Entertainment Group and Keith Addis & Associates)
 Last Light (1993)
 Attack of the 5 Ft. 2 In. Women (1994)
 Next Door (1994) (co-production with TriStar Television)
 End of Summer (1995)
 The Man in the Attic (1995) (co-production with CBS Productions)
 Zooman (March 19, 1995)
 The Wharf Rat (September 3, 1995)
 Bloodknot (September 7, 1995)
 The Courtyard (September 24, 1995)
 Full Body Massage (November 5, 1995)
 Favorite Deadly Sins (November 12, 1995)
 Out There (November 19, 1995)
 Triplecross (1995)
 Ruby Jean and Joe (1996)
 Conundrum (March 3, 1996)
 Boxing: A Different Look (1996)
 Undertow (March 24, 1996)
 Mr. and Mrs. Loving (March 31, 1996)
 Sabrina the Teenage Witch (1996) (co-production with Viacom Productions)
 Homecoming (April 14, 1996)
 Moonshine Highway (1996)
 The Legend of Gator Face (1996)
 Robin of Locksley (1996)
 Losing Chase (August 18, 1996)
 Gang in Blue (September 8, 1996)
 Annie O (1996)
 The Halfback of Notre Dame (1996)
 Amanda and the Alien (1996)
 Money Plays (1996)
 Mandela and de Klerk (February 16, 1997)
 Riot (April 27, 1997)
 North Shore Fish (June 29, 1997)
 Elvis Meets Nixon (August 10, 1997)
 The Right Connections (August 15, 1997) (co-production with Viacom Productions)
 Color of Justice (September 7, 1997)
 The Westing Game (September 14, 1997)
 Face Down (1997)
 Woman Undone (1997)
 Tricks (1997)
 The Defenders: Choices of Evils (1998) (co-production with Paramount Television)
 The Tiger Woods Story (1998) (co-production with Paramount Television and Stu Segall Productions)
 In The Doghouse (1998) (co-production with Viacom Productions, Once and Future Films and Shaken Not Stirred Productions)
 Aldrich Ames: Traitor Within (1998) (co-production with Paramount Television)
 The Defenders: Taking the First (1999) (co-production with Paramount Television)
 Noriega: God's Favorite (2000)
 Rated X (May 13, 2000)
 Harlan County War (2000)
 A House Divided (2000) (co-production with Paramount Television)
 The Thin Blue Lie (2000) (co-production with Paramount Television)
 Possessed (2000)
 Warden of Red Rock (2001) (co-production with Viacom Productions)
 My Horrible Year! (2001) (co-production with Paramount Television)
 The Wilde Girls (2001) (co-production with Viacom Productions)
 My Beautiful Son (2001) (co-production with Granada Entertainment)
 The Day Reagan Was Shot (2001) (co-production with Paramount Television)
 Keep the Faith, Baby (2002)
 10,000 Black Men Named George (2002) (co-production with Paramount Television)
 Bobbie's Girl (2002) (co-production with Paramount Television)
 Sightings: Heartland Ghost (2002) (co-production with Paramount Television)
 Carry Me Home (2003)
 Just Another Story (2003)
 The Mudge Boy (2003)
 Baadasssss! (2004)
 Bereft (2004)
 Dirt (2004)
 Fathers and Sons (2004)
 Sexual Life (2004)
 Speak (2004)
 The Best Thief in the World (2004)
 Paradise (2004)
 Sucker Free City (2004)
 Hate (2004)
 Pryor Offenses (2004; pilot)
 After Innocence (2005) (co-production with Showtime Documentary Films and American Film Foundation)
 Our Fathers (2005) (co-production with Dan Curits Productions)
 Mario Cantone: Laugh Whore (2005)
 The Good Humor Man (2005)
 Same Sex America (2006) (co-production with Corra Films and K2 Pictures)
 Home Front (2006) (co-production with Looking Glass Films and Swirl Productions)
 Shame (2007)
 Semper Fi: One Man's Journey (2007)
 In Pot We Trust (2007)
 A Game of Honor (2011)
 The Vatican: The Pope's Slippers (2013) (pilot; co-production with Sony Pictures Television)
 Steve-O: Guilty as Charged (2016)
 W. Kamau Bell: Semi-Promenint Nergo (2016) (co-production with Comedy Dynamics and Yeah Dude Productions)
 Trumped (2017) (co-production with Left/Right Productions)
 Nick Cannon: Stand Up, Don't Shoot (2017) (co-production with Comedy Dynamics and Ncredible Entertainment)
 Disgraced (2017)
 Al Madrigal: Shrimpin' Ain't Easy (2017) (co-production with Irwin Entertainment)
 Tim & Faith: Soul2Soul (2017) (co-production with Magical Elves Productions)
 American Dream/American Knightmare (2018) (co-production with Mythology Entertainment and Fuqua Films)
 Queen Fur (2018) (pilot; co-production with Sony Pictures Television)
 XY Chelsea (2019) (co-production with Showtime Documentary Films, British Film Institute, 19340 Productions, Diamond Docs, Faliro House Productions, Field of Vision, Pulse Films and Topic Studios)
 Quiet Storm: The Ron Artest Story (2019) (co-production with Showtime Documentary Films, Bleacher Report, CMD Productions and Jvarta)
 Ready for War (2019) (co-production with Showtime Documentary Films, Cedar Park Entertainment, Dreamcrew, Prettybird, North of Now Group and Entertainment One)
 Matt Rogers: Have You Ever Heard About Christmas (2022) (co-production with Rotten Science)

Showtime Documentary Films
 After Innocence (2005) (co-production with Showtime Networks and American Film Foundation)
 Home Front (2006) (co-production with Showtime Networks, Looking Glass Films and Swirl Productions)
 American Jihad (2017)
 XY Chelsea (2019) (co-production with Showtime Networks, British Film Institute, 19340 Productions, Diamond Docs, Faliro House Productions, Field of Vision, Pulse Films and Topic Studios)
 Quiet Storm: The Ron Artest Story (2019) (co-production with Showtime Networks, Bleacher Report, CMD Productions and Jvarta)
 Ready for War (2019) (co-production with Showtime Networks, Cedar Park Entertainment, Dreamcrew, Prettybird, North of Now Group and Entertainment One)

BET Networks 
 BET Awards (2001–present)
 Ceberation of Gospel (2001–2016)

VIS 
 The Butcher Surgeon, Why Wasn't He Stopped? (2017)
 Wallis: The Queen That Never Was (2017)
 The Battle for Britain's Heroes (2018) (co-production with Uplands Television)
 Albert: The Power Behind Victoria (2018)
 Stephen King Master of Horror (2018)
 Meghan and the Markles: A Family at War (2019)
 When Buildings Collapse: World's Worse Engineering Disasters (2019)
 Inside the Cockpit: The Concorde Crash (2019)
 Inside Lidl at Christmas (2020)
 Aldi's Easter Secrets (2021)
 Neighbours Made Me a Star: From Ramsay St to Hollywood (2022)
 Neighbours All The Pops Hits & More (2022)

Group W Productions 
 Lost in London (1985) (co-production with Emmanuel Lewis Entertainment Enterprises, Inc. and D’Angelo Productions, Inc.)
 Mafia Princess (1986)
 Soldier Boys (1987)
 Fatal Judgement (1988)
 Gangs (1988)
 Taking a Stand (1989)

Spelling Television 
 The Monk (1969)
 How Awful About Allan (1970)
 River of Gold (1971)
 Two for the Money (1972)
 Rolling Man (1972)
 Kate Bliss and the Ticker Tape Kid (1978)
 The Users (1978)
 The Power Within (1979)
 The Return of The Mod Squad (1979) (with Danny Thomas Productions)
 Massarati and the Brain (1982)
 Velvet (1984)
 International Airport (1985)
 Mr. and Mrs. Ryan (1986)
 Day One (1989) (with World International Network)
 Just Temporary (1989)
 Satan's School for Girls (2000)

QM Productions
 The Aliens are Coming! (1980) (with Woodruff Productions)
The Return of Frank Cannon (1980)
Senior Trip (1981) (with Kenneth Johnson Productions)
 September Gun (1983)

Notes

References 

Paramount Global

Television programs